Panacridops is a genus of flies in the family Stratiomyidae.

Distribution
Panama.

Species
Panacridops varians James & Woodley, 1980

References

Stratiomyidae
Brachycera genera
Diptera of North America
Endemic fauna of Panama